The following is a list of Art Deco theaters in Metro Manila, theaters constructed in the 1930s to 1950s built in Art Deco style, or a similar branch of the style like Streamline Moderne, in the Philippines. The construction of these early theaters in the Manila metropolitan area provided the venue for early forms of entertainment like bodabil, a local adaptation of vaudeville, with most eventually converting to movie theaters with the growth and popularity of Philippine cinema in the metropolis, while some were showing American films. Several theaters built within the city of Manila were designed by prominent Philippine architects, including future National Artists Juan Nakpil and Pablo Antonio.  Unfortunately, a lot of these theaters have since been closed and several of them demolished, while movie theaters in the Philippines shifted to shopping mall-based movie theaters.

Performing arts theaters

Ateneo Auditorium
Once described as "the best theater in the Orient," this theater was on Dakota Street in Ermita.  The construction of the auditorium began in May 1935 and was completed in time for the commencement ceremony in 1936.  Its architect, Juan Nakpil , was an Ateneo alumnus.  The hall had six hundred seats on the ground floor and 193 more in the cantilevered boxes.  There were boxes upstairs, and four proscenia.  Other features were a projection room and nineteen dressing rooms.  The theater was badly damaged in February 1945 during the Battle of Manila, and its ruins were later demolished.

FEU Auditorium 

The FEU Auditorium is the Administration Building’s centerpiece. It houses 1040 seats and occupies three floors of the four story building.

Art Deco features abound in the design of the Auditorium and include the gradual curves, the ribbed piers and geometric volumes and patterns. Above the orchestra section are star or diamond like patterns which also serve as lighting fixtures. Above the balcony are triangles which also serve as air conditioning ducts. These, together with the green and gold theme, and the subtle lettering of "FEU" under the boxes were all combined in a regal manner. The interior was restored in 2002-2003 and was also infused with new lighting, sound and video equipment. It was the only post-war venue with air-conditioning and a revolving stage. It used to be the Cultural Center of the Philippines in the 1950s given that all the foremost Filipino and foreign performers of the time performed there.

Manila Metropolitan Theater

The Manila Metropolitan Theater is located on Padre Burgos Avenue, Ermita district adjacent to the Mehan Garden. The theater was built in 1931 with an Art Deco design by architects Juan M. Arellano and Otillio Arellano and could accommodate as many as 1,670 people. The theater is endowed with bronze sculptures depicting female performers designed by Francesco Riccardo Monti, a stained glass mural mounted above the main audience entrance, and relief woodcarvings of Philippine plants found in the interior lobby made by Isabelo Tampingco. The theater was restored in 1978, but was again closed in 1996 due to lack support from the public and local officials.  Its east wing was used as an office space for government services.

The theater has undergone renovations which began in 2018, and is set to open in April 27,2021.

Saint Cecilia's Hall

Saint Cecilia's Hall is located at St. Scholastica's College Manila.

U.P. University Theater
This theater was on Taft Avenue.

Zorilla Theatre

A former venue for Spanish-language and Tagalog-language stage performances which was located along Recto Avenue.

Movie theaters

Avenue Theater
Another architectural work by Juan Nakpil was the Avenue Theater, whose construction was completed in 1938. Located on Rizal Avenue in Santa Cruz, when the theater opened it had a 1,470 seating capacity with its lobby bearing a Belgian marble finish flooring and exclusively showing Paramount Pictures films in the Philippines. First-run movies of Warner Bros., First National, Columbia Pictures Corp., United Artists Corp., and R.K.O. Radio Pictures Corp. were also shown.  At one point, the building housed a hotel and also served as office space. In 2006, it was demolished to make way for a parking lot, as realty costs were too expensive for it to be maintained. As of 2013, this site is occupied by Padi's Point, and behind it is a parking lot.

Bellevue Theater
The Bellevue Theater is one of a few classic Philippine theaters built in the 1930s still running today. It is located on Pedro Gil Street (formerly Herran), in Paco district and has a total seating capacity of 600. The theater features a Neo Mudejar theme, and contains a quonset hut design, and other classic ornamentation. The theater is not currently operational and a general merchandise store occupies its first floor. As of 2013, this site is occupied by Novo Jeans and T-shirt.

Benper Theater 
This 1960s-style building on Roosevelt Avenue in Quezon City has Art Deco features. The structure and cinema was originally owned by the Ang family, one of the first Filipino-Chinese clans in San Francisco del Monte, Quezon City. "Benper" came from the late couple's combined name - Benito Ang and his spouse Peregrina Dela Rosa.

Capitol Theater

Situated in Escolta Street in Binondo, the Capitol Theater was designed by Juan Nakpil, and built in 1935. With the strong presence of symmetry, geometric shapes, and the occasional presence of graceful curves, the design is strongly identified with the Art Deco visual arts design style which was very popular during the 1930s.

Façade
The most prominent elements of the façade are the reliefs of two Filipina muses done by Francesco Ricardo Monti. 
Symmetrically installed, the two Filipina muses are explicitly portrayed in native garb or traje de mestizas, evoking contrast between their rural representation and urbanized location. Further contrast can be found in the details of their skirts, where strong lines and soft curves are juxtaposed to depict the pleats of their terno. Both muses carry symbols strongly associated with the performing arts – the left muse carries a mask [associated with theater arts], while the right muse carries a lyre [associated with music].

The bottom of both reliefs are images of film and film reels, likewise executed symmetrically. The presence of these elements are in line with the establishment’s purpose as a cinema, and consistent with the Art Deco style which heavily favors bold geometric shapes.        
Concrete letters spelling the word “Capitol”, once adorned the top of the structure, but only the letters I and T are left. Additional Art Deco elements can be found in the strong geometric details of the top corners and the central iron grills which marries both straight and curved lines.

Interiors
The double-balcony theatre had a total of 800 seats and was among Manila’s air-conditioned theaters. Its lobby was adorned with a mural called “Rising Philippines” created by Victorio C. Edades, Carlos V. Francisco, and Galo B. Ocampo.

Damage and Decay
It was ultimately the deterioration of the theatre business in Manila that led to the stoppage of Capitol Theater’s operations as a cinema. The construction of the Manila LRT Line 1 and the extensive delays prompted movie goers to prefer newly opened air –conditioned malls with newer cinemas. As of June 2020, most of the theater has been demolished, with only the facade intact.

Cine Concepcion 
This movie house was located in Malabon.

Cine Oro
This movie house was located at Plaza Santa Cruz.(see nineteenth photo). Various photos showed that the Cinema was also called the Astor, Savoy, and Radio at one point.

Ever Theater
The Ever Theater is located along Rizal Avenue in Santa Cruz district. The theater was also designed by Juan Nakpil and has a single screen cinema with an 800 seating capacity. It was also visited by Walter Gropius during its inauguration in the 1950s, praising the theater's outstanding qualities. Currently closed as a theater, it now serves the public as a commercial arcade. As of 2013, this site is occupied by Astrotel, a hotel.

Gaiety Theater

The Gaiety Theater was located Del Pilar Street in the Ermita district in the city of Manila. It was designed in the art deco style in 1935 by Juan Nakpil. As of 2014, it is dilapidated with several families living inside as caretakers. It was demolished in 2016.

Grand Theater
This movie house was on Rizal Avenue.

Ideal Theater
The Ideal Theater was located at Rizal Avenue corner Carriedo Street, Santa Cruz district and designed by the late architect Pablo S. Antonio, Sr. in 1933, the theater was exclusively showing Metro-Goldwyn-Mayer (MGM) films in the Philippines. The theater was demolished in the late 1970s to give way to the construction of a department store now present site of Philtrust Bank Carriedo Branch. The Ideal Theater in 1933, in front Capitan Luis Gonzaga Bldg in 1953 was one of the first major works of Pablo Antonio along with the Nicanor B. Reyes Sr. Hall main buildings in 1939 of Far Eastern University and Manila Polo Club.

Life Theater

Lyric Theater
This movie house was at 81 Escolta Street, Binondo.  An American, Frank Goulette, acquired this theater in 1916 and reopened it in 1917. In 1929 it was a 1,400-seat theater, with no air conditioning, and was considered to be the only first-class movie house in town.  This second version of the theater had been designed by Fernando De la Cantera.  It was reconstructed, the third time, as a deco building with the largest air-conditioning installation among Manila theaters, by Pablo Antonio and reopened on June 1, 1937 and was exclusively showing Warner Bros. films.  In 1939, the Lyric was one of six movie houses in Manila which were considered to be "the most presentable and modernized sort," each of which seated about 1,200 patrons.

Morosi Theater
This Italian-named theater on Taft Avenue in Pasay was demolished in 2016.

Radio Theater
In August 1929 this movie house was the first to show a sound film in the Philippines, which was the American movie Syncopation.

Rex Theater
This movie house was on Salazar Street, Binondo.

Scala Theater
Another theater designed by Pablo Antonio was the Scala Theatre, also on Avenida Rizal in Santa Cruz. With its floors paced with tea rose marble and its curved wall lined with glass blocks, the theater's magnificence did not last: it was closed in the 1990s. The theater catered to up to 600 people for its single screen operations. As of 2013, the theater is now closed though the building structures still remain, albeit in a dire condition.

State Theater
Another work of the late architect Juan Nakpil, the State Theater was on Rizal Avenue, Santa Cruz. Built in the 1930s with an art deco design, the theater was eventually closed in the 1990s, and was demolished in 2001. As of 2013, this site is occupied by Emerald Circle, a mini-mall.

Times Theater

The Times Theater, on Quezon Boulevard, Quiapo, was designed by Architect Luis Z. Araneta. It was erected in 1939, with an Art Moderne relief. Unmaintained today, the theater is still operational, and can accommodate 800 people with its single screen operations.

Tivoli Theater
This movie house was located at Plaza Santa Cruz.

See also
Architecture of the Philippines
Cinema of the Philippines
List of theaters and concert halls in Manila
List of cinemas in Manila

References

Theaters in Manila
Art Deco architecture in the Philippines
Manila, City of
Cinema of the Philippines
Former buildings and structures in Manila
Manila-related lists
Philippine film-related lists
Lists of buildings and structures in the Philippines